Franco Ramos Mingo (born 18 September 1997) is an Argentine footballer who plays as a defender for Spanish team Las Rozas CF on loan from San Fernando CD.

He is the brother of current Barcelona B player Santiago Ramos Mingo.

Career statistics

Club

Notes

References

External links 
 

1997 births
Living people
Footballers from Córdoba, Argentina
Argentine footballers
Association football defenders
Boca Juniors footballers
USL League One players
Toronto FC II players
Segunda División B players
Las Rozas CF players
San Fernando CD players
Argentine expatriate footballers
Argentine expatriate sportspeople in Canada
Argentine expatriate sportspeople in Spain
Expatriate soccer players in Canada
Expatriate footballers in Spain